The Reserve Infantry Division of Guyuan Area() was a short-lived reserve infantry formation of the People's Liberation Army active between 1984 and 1985.

The division was formally activated on June 8, 1984, in Guyuan, Ningxia. The division was then composed of:
1st Regiment - Longde
2nd Regiment - Xiji
3rd Regiment - Haiyuan
Artillery Regiment

In October 1985 the division was disbanded along with all its subordinates.

References

Reserve divisions of the People's Liberation Army
Military units and formations established in 1984